The 2019 SBS Drama Awards, presented by Seoul Broadcasting System (SBS), took place on December 31, 2019 at SBS Prism Tower, Sangam-dong, Mapo-gu, Seoul. It was hosted by Shin Dong-yup and Jang Na-ra.

Winners and nominees

Presenters

Special performances

See also 
2019 KBS Drama Awards
2019 MBC Drama Awards

References

External links 
 

Seoul Broadcasting System original programming
2019 television awards
SBS Drama Awards
2019 in South Korea
December 2019 events in South Korea